Kalna subdivision is an administrative subdivision of the Purba Bardhaman district in the state of West Bengal, India.

Overview
Kalna subdivision is spread mostly across the Bhagirathi basin, with its western part intruding into the Bardhaman plain, the central plain area of the district.

Subdivisions
Purba Bardhaman district is divided into the following administrative subdivisions:

Administrative units
  

Kalna subdivision has  4 police stations, 5 community development blocks, 5 panchayat samitis, 47 gram panchayats, 543 mouzas, 525 inhabited villages, 1 municipality and 9 census towns. The single municipality is at Kalna. The census towns are: Srirampur, Hatsimla, Jaluidanga, Gopinathpur, Nasratpur, Dhatrigram, Piarinagar, Uttar Goara and Shashpur. The subdivision has its headquarters at Kalna.

Demographics
As per the 2011 Census of India data Kalna subdivision, after bifurcation of Bardhaman district in 2017, had a total population of 1,087,732. There were 556,573 (51%) males and 531,159 (49%) females. Population below 6 years was 113,711.

As per the 2011 census data the total number of literates in Kalna subdivision, after bifurcation of Bardhaman district in 2017, was 732,111 (75.16% of the population over 6 years) out of which males numbered 402,516 (80.70% of the male population over 6 years) and females numbered 329,595 (69.35% of the female population over 6 years).

See also – List of West Bengal districts ranked by literacy rate

In the 2011 census Hindus numbered 766,230 and formed 70.44% of the population in Kalna subdivision. Muslims numbered 306,360 and formed 28.17% of the population. Christians numbered 1,859 and formed 0.17% of the population. Others numbered 13,283 and formed 1.22% of the population.

Police stations
Police stations in Kalna subdivision have the following features and jurisdiction:

Blocks
Community development blocks in Kalna subdivision are:

Gram panchayats
The subdivision contains 47 gram panchayats under 5 community development blocks:

 Kalna I block consists of nine gram panchayats, viz. Atgharia Simlan, Dhatrigram, Krishnadevpur, Baghnapara, Hatkalna, Nandai, Begpur, Kankuria and Sultanpur. 
 Kalna II block consists of eight gram panchayats, viz. Akalpaus, Badla, Baradhamas, Pindira, Anukhal, Baidyapur, Kalyanpur and Satgachhi.
 Manteswar block consists of 13 gram panchayats, viz. Baghson, Kusumgram, Monteswar, Vagra Mulgram, Bamunpara, Majhergram, Pipalan, Denur, Mamudpur–I, Putsuri, Jamna, Mamudpur–II and Shushunia.
 Purbasthali I block consists of seven gram panchayats, viz. Bogpur, Jahannagar, Nasratpur, Srirampur, Dogachhia, Nadanghat and Samudragarh.
 Purbasthali II block consists of ten gram panchayats, viz. Jhaudanga, Majdia, Nimdaha, Purbasthali, Kalekhantala–I, Mertala, Patuli, Kalekhantala–II, Muksimpara and Pilla.

Economy

Agriculture
In the erstwhile Bardhaman district agriculture was the pre-dominant economic activity and the main source of livelihood for the rural people.  The soil and climate favours the production of food grains. Cash crops are also grown. Irrigation facilities had contributed in a major way towards higher agricultural productivity. Amongst the districts of West Bengal, Bardhaman district had maximum irrigated land under cultivation. Given below is an overview of the agricultural production (all data in tonnes) for Bardhaman Sadar North subdivision, other subdivisions and the Purba Bardhaman district, after bifurcation of the erstwhile Bardhaman district, with data for the year 2013-14.

Education
Given in the table below (data in numbers) is a comprehensive picture of the education scenario in Purba Bardhaman district, after bifurcation of Bardhaman district in 2017, with data for the year 2013-14:

Note: Primary schools include junior basic schools; middle schools, high schools and higher secondary schools include madrasahs; technical schools include junior technical schools, junior government polytechnics, industrial technical institutes, industrial training centres, nursing training institutes etc.; technical and professional colleges include engineering colleges, medical colleges, para-medical institutes, management colleges, teachers training and nursing training colleges, law colleges, art colleges, music colleges etc. Special and non-formal education centres include sishu siksha kendras, madhyamik siksha kendras, centres of Rabindra mukta vidyalaya, recognised Sanskrit tols, institutions for the blind and other handicapped persons, Anganwadi centres, reformatory schools etc.

The following institutions are located in Kalna subdivision:
Kalna College was established at Kalna in 1943.
Purbasthali College was established at Parulia in 2009.
Dr. Gourmohan Roy College was established at Monteswar in 1986.
Badla Vivekananda B.Ed. College was established at Badla in 2015.

Healthcare
The table below (all data in numbers) presents an overview of the medical facilities available and patients treated in the hospitals, health centres and sub-centres in 2014 in Purba Bardhaman district, after bifurcation of the erstwhile Bardhaman district in 2017, with data for the year 2013-14.

Medical facilities available in Kalna subdivision are as follows:

Hospitals: (Name, location, beds)
Kalna Subdivisional Hospital, Kalna, 200 beds
Indian Red Cross Society, Kalna, 8 beds
Rural Hospitals: (Name, CD block, location, beds)
Srirampur Rural Hospital, Purbasthali I CD block, Srirampur, PO Vidyanagar, 30 beds
Purbasthali Rural Hospital, Purbasthali II CD block, Purbasthali, 30 beds
Atgharia Rural Hospital, Kalna I CD block, Atgharia, 30 beds
Monteswar Rural Hospital, Manteswar CD block, Monteswar, 30 beds
Block Primary Health Centre: (Name, block, location, beds)
Badla BPHC, Kalna II, Badla, PO Chagram, 15 beds
Primary Health Centres: (CD block-wise)(CD block, PHC location, beds)
Kalna I: Baghnapara (10), Sahajpur (6), Sultanpur (10)
Kalna II: Akalpoush (6), Angarson, PO Pindra (2), Baidyapur (15), Tehatta (2)
Manteswar: Dhanyakherur, PO Majhergram (10), Moinampur, PO Katsihi (6), Putsuri (6)
Purbasthali I: Dogachhia, PO Rai Dogachhia (4), Nadanghat (10), Nowapara (4)
Purbasthali II: Kubajpur, PO Rai Dogachhia (4), Nimdah, PO Belerhat (6), Patuli (10), Singari, PO Laxmipur (10)

Electoral constituencies
Lok Sabha (parliamentary) and Vidhan Sabha (state assembly) constituencies in Kalna subdivision were as follows:

External links

References

Subdivisions of West Bengal
Subdivisions in Purba Bardhaman district